Sir Thomas Freke (27 September 1563 – 5 May 1633) was an English merchant adventurer and politician who sat in the House of Commons at various times between 1584 and 1626.

Freke was the eldest son of Robert Freke of Iwerne Courtney, and his wife Alice Swayne, daughter of Robert Swayne of Blandford. His father was teller of the Exchequer and surveyor for Dorset. In 1584, Freke was elected Member of Parliament for Dorchester. He succeeded his father in 1592 and became a J.P. for Dorset. He was High Sheriff of Dorset from 1597 to 1598.

Freke was knighted in 1603. He was Deputy Lieutenant of Dorset for about 30 years, and was a respected figure in the county. He and his son were owners of the ship 'Leopold' of Weymouth, which was one of the largest Dorset privateers. In 1604 he was elected MP for Dorset. He became a member of the King's council for Virginia in 1607. He was High Sheriff of Dorset again from 1611 to 1612. In 1612 he was on the council for the Virginia Company. He was elected MP for Dorset again in 1626.

Freke married Elizabeth Taylor  daughter of John Taylor of Burton Bradstock and had seven sons and five daughters. She died in 1640. His son John Freke was also an MP. His daughter Alice married Sir George Hastings.

References

1563 births
1633 deaths
High Sheriffs of Dorset
English merchants
16th-century merchants
17th-century merchants
Members of the Parliament of England for Dorchester
English knights
English MPs 1584–1585
English MPs 1604–1611
English MPs 1626